Vito Marchione (born 16 December 1971) is a retired Luxembourgian football striker.

References

1971 births
Living people
Luxembourgian footballers
CS Grevenmacher players
Jeunesse Esch players
Association football forwards
Luxembourg under-21 international footballers
Luxembourg international footballers